Redfern is an English surname of French Norman origin. It originally appeared as De Redeven. Notable people with the surname include:

 Alastair Redfern (born 1948), English bishop
 Anthea Redfern (born 1948), British television host
 Arthur E. Redfern (1885–1917), American jockey
 Charles E. Redfern (1839–1929), Canadian politician
 Chris Redfern (born 1964), American politician from Ohio
 David Redfern (1936–2014), British music photographer
 Harry Redfern (1861–1950), British architect
 Henry Jasper Redfern (1871–1928), British optician, photographer, film maker and x-ray pioneer
 Jamie Redfern (born 1957), Australian pop singer
 Nick Redfern (born 1964), British ufologist
 Paul Redfern (1902–unknown), American aviator
 Rebecca Redfern (born 1999), British para-swimmer
 Shuldham Redfern (1895–1985), British civil servant in the Sudan and Canada
 William Redfern (1774–1833), Australian surgeon

Pen name 
 Cameron S. Redfern (born 1968), pen name of Australian author Sonya Hartnett

In fiction
 Christine and Patrick Redfern, fictional characters from Evil Under the Sun
 Jeff and Rick Redfern, fictional characters from Doonesbury
 Joan Redfern, a school matron in the Doctor Who episodes "Human Nature" and "The Family of Blood"